Sachar may refer to:

 Sachar (biblical figure), a minor biblical figure
  Sachar- A Punjabi Khatri Surname
 Abram L. Sachar, an American historian and university president
 Bhim Sen Sachar, an Indian politician
 Howard Sachar, an American historian and an author
 Louis Sachar, an American author of children's books
 Raghav Sachar, an Indian singer
 Rajinder Sachar, Chief Justice of High Court of Delhi, New Delhi

See also
 Sacchar (Greek for sugar), the root word of saccharine.
 Sakar (disambiguation)